McFly is an English pop rock band.

McFly can also refer to:

Marty McFly, the protagonist in the Back to the Future film series
George McFly, Marty's father
Lorraine McFly, Marty's mother